Beall Springs is an unincorporated community in Warren County, in the U.S. state of Georgia.

History
Beall Springs was named after the Beall family, original owners of the town site.

References

Unincorporated communities in Warren County, Georgia
Unincorporated communities in Georgia (U.S. state)